The Bank of America Center is a 404-foot skyscraper in Downtown Orlando.

The building is one of the tallest in the city, and is a unique part of the skyline. The postmodern building was designed by Texas-based Morris-Aubry Architects, who modeled the building after their recently completed One American Center in Austin, Texas. Its collection of 10 spires gives it an almost gothic appearance, and its staircase design makes it similar in appearance to another Bank of America building in Houston. The building was owned by Cousins Properties of Atlanta, Georgia, and sold in January 2018 to Southwest Value Partners based in San Diego, California.

History 
April 1985, the Pillar-Bryton Company announced plans and unveiled the model for a new development in downtown Orlando, Florida on a 10-acre site off Orange Avenue named "du Pont Centre", the overall project cost was estimated to be $400 million once completed, with the first building costing $78 million. The announcement was made by the owner of the development company and an Orlando resident which was William DuPont III, heir to the Du Pont family fortune. In 1985, Forbes estimated the 32-year-old heir's wealth to be at least $125 million.   
William du Pont III later sold the remaining undeveloped property. Bad investments and business deals caused him to also sell his ownership interest in the building in the 1990s.

The building is slated to be undergoing $1–2 million renovations every year up until 2020 which may total $8 million by the current owners. The current owners acquired the property via acquisition of Parkway Properties in a multibillion-dollar deal. Parkway Properties purchased the building in May 2011 for approximately $61 million.

In January 2018, a San Diego-based real estate firm Southwest Value Partners purchased the building for $81.86 million along with two other downtown Orlando buildings in a package deal valued over $208 million.

References 

Bank of America buildings
Postmodern architecture in Florida
Skyscraper office buildings in Orlando, Florida
Office buildings completed in 1988
Bank buildings in Florida
1988 establishments in Florida